The Last Don is a 1997 CBS miniseries based on the novel The Last Don by Mario Puzo.

Cast
 Danny Aiello - Don Domenico Clericuzio
 David Marciano - Giorgio
 Jason Gedrick - Cross De Lena
 Joe Mantegna - Pippi De Lena
 Burt Young - Virginio Ballazzo
 Christopher Meloni - Boz Skannet
 Kirstie Alley - Rose Marie Clericuzio
 Penelope Ann Miller - Nalene De Lena
 Robert Wuhl - Bobby Bantz
 Rory Cochrane - Dante Santadio
 Seymour Cassel - Alfred Gronevelt
 Daryl Hannah - Athena Aquitane

References

External links
 

CBS network films
American television miniseries
1997 television films
1997 films
Films directed by Graeme Clifford